Gustav Scharfe (11 September 1835 – 25 June 1892) was a German operatic baritone and voice teacher.

Life 
However, because of his outstanding musical and vocal talents, he took on a successful engagement as an opera singer at the Dresden Court Opera for several years.

He later went to England and trained there for the higher demands of singing. Returning to Dresden, he devoted himself very successfully to teaching singing, most recently at the Hochschule für Musik Carl Maria von Weber Dresden (along, among others, Felix Draeseke, Aglaja Orgeni). He was awarded the title Professor of Music by the King of Saxony for his services as a teacher in 1880.

Scharfe published an excellent singing school:  (The Methodical Development of the Voice).

Scharfe died in Dresden at 56 of age.

Students 
 Hans Buff-Giessen, Walther Falkenstein, Richard Gutzschbach, Erika Wedekind, Emil Goetze

References

External links 
 

German operatic baritones
1835 births
1892 deaths
People from Grimma
19th-century German male opera singers